Qorqori Rural District is a rural district (dehestan) in Qorqori District, Hirmand County, Sistan and Baluchestan province, Iran. At the 2006 census, its population was 15,172, in 3,074 families.  The rural district has 64 villages.

References 

Rural Districts of Sistan and Baluchestan Province
Hirmand County